The Czech Republic had almost two gigawatts (GW) of photovoltaic capacity at the end of 2010, but installed less than 10 megawatts (MW) in 2011 due to the feed-in tariff being reduced by 25%, after installing almost 1,500 MW the year before. Installations increased to 109 MW in 2012. In 2014, no new installations were reported.

In 2003 a Czech-Austrian information and training center for solar power was founded in the village of Věžovatá Pláně in South Bohemia. That same year major Josef Mach claimed that the electricity from the Temelín nuclear power plant in the Czech Republic would be abandoned. He is known as one of the biggest Temelín opponents in the Czech Republic.

See also

Renewable energy in the Czech Republic
Energy in the Czech Republic
List of renewable energy topics by country
Solar power in the European Union

References

External links